"And Then There Were 10" is the pilot episode of the American animated television series Ben 10.  It originally aired on Cartoon Network on December 27, 2005 as a sneak peek during Cartoon Network's "Sneak Peek Week" block, airing alongside fellow Cartoon Network original series My Gym Partner's a Monkey, Cartoon Network European co-production Robotboy, and acquired Canadian YTV series Zixx. The series made its official debut on January 13, 2006. The episode, along with the rest of the episodes of the first season, was released on DVD on February 6, 2007.

Plot

Ben Tennyson, a 10-year-old from the city of Bellwood, and his smart-mouthed paternal twin cousin, Gwen, begin their cross-country summer vacation with their grandfather, Max, but Max first helps Ben off a tree branch from which his school rivals Cash Murray and JT have hung him by his underwear. While camping at Yosemite National Park, Max tries to cheer up his grandchildren with camp-based activities, but neither will participate and Ben wanders off into the woods. Meanwhile, in outer space, Vilgax, a Chimera Sui Generis warlord who is considered one of the most feared beings in the Milky Way, is commanding his warship, the Chimerian Hammer, which is in pursuit of a small courier ship that is carrying the Omnitrix, a wristwatch-styled device capable of transforming the wearer into various alien species. Vilgax is intent on using the Omnitrix to equip an entire army which will be under his control. As the battle reaches Earth's orbit, the deflector shields on both ships are disabled and the Hammer'''s bridge is hit by a powerful blast. Most of the courier ship is destroyed by return fire, but not before the Omnitrix is jettisoned from the ship in a pod that falls to Earth. Ben, who just so happens to be very close to the pod's crash site, attempts to investigate, and the Omnitrix jumps out of the pod towards him and attaches to his left wrist. After several failed attempts to get it off, he accidentally transforms into a Pyronite (dubbed Heatblast) and accidentally starts a forest fire. Max and Gwen notice the smoke from their campsite and try putting the flames out with fire extinguishers, but are surprised to recognize Heatblast and advise him absorb the fire via back-draft. All is explained back at the campsite as the Omnitrix times out, so Max leaves to search the crash site for answers, warning his grandson against fooling around with the watch. Ben nevertheless disobeys despite getting caught by Gwen, and leaps back into the woods as a Vulpimancer (dubbed Wildmutt). Confined to a healing chamber, Vilgax sends a giant drone down to the crash site, where it destroys the pod and launches two smaller drones to search the area. They attack Wildmutt, who leaps atop one and sends it crashing into a cliff, whereas Gwen smashes the other with a shovel. Back at the Rust Bucket'', Max lectures Ben for going behind his back, but the discussion is interrupted by a park ranger's radio report of the giant drone attacking a nearby RV camp. The Tennysons deduce the watch as its target and head over to the scene, where Ben tries to fend off the robot as a Petrosapien (dubbed Diamondhead) whilst Max and Gwen evacuate the campers. The droid tosses Diamondhead like a rag doll, and he gets distracted saving Gwen from a falling tree. Realizing its lasers can bounce off his silicon skin, he goads the robot into firing one at him, which he redirects to its upper body, destroying it. The defeat of his drone upsets Vilgax, who vows revenge against whoever is keeping the Omnitrix from him, but nonetheless waits until his wounds are fully healed. Ben returns to Bellwood overnight as a Kineceleran (dubbed XLR8) and hangs Cash and JT from a tree by their underwear as payback for the similar humiliation earlier. When he returns to Yosemite the next morning, Max and Gwen are packing up the "Rust Bucket", so XLR8 helps speed the effort along in time to hit the road early.

See also
 Lists of Ben 10 episodes

References

External links
 IMDb

Ben 10 television series
2005 American television episodes
American television series premieres